Unitarian Church of Vancouver (UCV) is the largest and oldest Unitarian congregation in British Columbia, Canada, established in 1909.

The church meets every Sunday morning in the building at 949 West 49th Avenue (at Oak) in Vancouver.

The church has many active groups and committees and also offers space to various organizations.

Beliefs 
Like most North American Unitarian congregations, the belief system is pluralistic and could be phrased as "spiritual but not religious" in the sense of required adherence to a particular creed. Rev. Phillip Hewett was quoted in the Vancouver Courier saying, “The Unitarian movement has been set up to be based on personal spirituality, your own development, rather than adherence to a particular creed”.

Advocacy and social responsibility 
The congregation has active teams that work on social justice issues, including the environment, gender equality, racial justice and resettlement of refugees.

The Vancouver Unitarian congregation is particularly well known for its environmental advocacy. Some of the first meetings that led to the formation of Greenpeace were held on its campus. In 2012, the congregation divested Enbridge stock and encouraged members to do the same.

Architecture 
The campus was designed by member and architect, Wolfgang Gerson, and has won architectural awards. It was constructed in the 1960s.

UCV’s award-winning 1964 buildings, the sanctuary, Hewett Centre, and the office building, are noted for their "simplicity and serenity". In 1998 they were voted among the "most beautiful" in Vancouver by a panel of architectural experts.

The Fireside Room is noted for being an early meeting place of the Don't Make a Wave Committee, which later evolved into Greenpeace. It received a Places That Matter designation and plaque noting this history.

The site has two labyrinths on the property. One is a classical three-circuit square and the other a double-processional labyrinth in the garden on the west side.

Leadership 
The current transitional minister is Rev. Lara Cowtan. 

Rev. Dr. Steven Epperson served as minister from 2001 to 2020. Rev. Phillip Hewett was parish minister for 35 years from 1956 to 1991. He was appointed minister emeritus. He died February 24, 2018, at the age of 93.

References

External links 
 Vancouver Unitarians
 溫哥華尋道會

Unitarian Universalism in Canada
Churches in Vancouver
Heritage buildings in Vancouver